Brad Thiessen (born March 19, 1986) is a Canadian former professional ice hockey goaltender who played briefly in the National Hockey League (NHL) with the Pittsburgh Penguins.

Thiessen played three seasons in the British Columbia Hockey League before playing three seasons of collegiate ice hockey at Northeastern University. In his junior season at Northeastern, Thiessen was named Hockey East Player of the Year, a conference all-star, an NCAA first-team All-American, and a Hobey Baker Award "hat trick" finalist. At the end of the 2008–09 season, Thiessen signed a contract with the Pittsburgh Penguins as an undrafted free agent.

Playing career

Amateur
Thiessen played three seasons in the junior A British Columbia Hockey League. In 2003–04 with the Penticton Panthers, Thiessen appeared in 42 games, finishing with a record of 13–17–1. The following season with the Prince George Spruce Kings, he finished 12–22–1. In his final season of junior hockey with the Prince George Spruce Kings and Merritt Centennials in 2005–06 (he was traded during the season), Thiessen achieved career best statistics with a 22–21–4 record, a 2.88 goals against average, and a .922 save percentage.

After junior hockey, Thiessen played for Northeastern University in Boston, Massachusetts for three seasons, from 2006 to 2009.

During his freshman season in 2006–07, Thiessen was named to the Hockey East All-Rookie team. That season he appeared in 33 games, earning an 11–17–5 record. The next season, he was 16–17–3.

In Thiessen's junior year during the 2008–09 season, he led the team to one of its most successful seasons, including its first trip to the NCAA tournament in over 15 years. He was the 2008–09 Hockey East Player of the Year, a Hockey East all-star, an NCAA All-American, and a finalist for the Hobey Baker Award. That season, Thiessen set school records for wins (25), goals against average (2.12), save percentage (.931), saves (1,195), games (41) and minutes played (2,495:44). He led the NCAA in saves, was third in minutes played, and fourth in save percentage. He also became Northeastern's all-time top goaltender in goals against average (2.40), save percentage (.922) and shutouts (9).

Professional
After his third year at Northeastern, rather than play his senior season, Thiessen signed as an undrafted free agent with the Pittsburgh Penguins and joined the organization's American Hockey League affiliate in Wilkes-Barre/Scranton, though appeared in no games that season. After the Wilkes-Barre/Scranton Penguins season ended, Thiessen was among a number of players who participated with the Pittsburgh Penguins in practice during the Stanley Cup playoffs. Though he never dressed for a game, Thiessen was with the team when they defeated the Detroit Red Wings in game seven to win the Stanley Cup.  He was included on the team picture, and awarded a Stanley Cup ring before playing his first pro game.

Thiessen split time during the 2009–10 season with the Wilkes-Barre/Scranton Penguins and their ECHL affiliate Wheeling Nailers. In 30 regular season appearances with the Penguins, Thiessen earned a 14–14–1 record, while he was 8–3–0 with Wheeling.

During the 2010–11 season, Thiessen was named as the Eastern Conference's starting goaltender for the 2011 AHL All-Star Classic. At the time of the All-Star break, Thiessen led the AHL with 17 wins. He became the second Penguin to be named to the All-Star team after Dany Sabourin in 2006. On his 25th birthday, he became the third Penguins goaltender to record 30 wins in a single season, joining Dany Sabourin (2005–06) and John Curry (2007–08).

On March 24, 2011, Thiessen was recalled by the Pittsburgh Penguins due to an injury to backup goalie Brent Johnson, but did not play in an NHL game.

On February 24, 2012, Thiessen was recalled by the Penguins again and on February 26 he played in his first NHL game, registering his first career NHL win, 4–2 against the Columbus Blue Jackets.

On March 7, 2012, Thiessen recorded his second career win in just as many starts. The Penguins overcame a 2–0 deficit to beat the Toronto Maple Leafs 3–2.

On July 15, 2013, Thiessen opted to leave North America and signed his first European contract with HIFK of the Finnish Liiga. After only 8 games, Thiessen opted to end his HIFK career and was mutually released on November 19, 2013. On November 28, 2013, he signed a contract with the Norfolk Admirals of the AHL for the remainder of the season.

On July 3, 2014, Thiessen was signed as a free agent to a one-year, two-way contract with the Calgary Flames. At the tail end of the season, on April 5, 2015, Thiessen was called up by the Calgary from the Adirondack Flames and served as backup without making his debut for the club.

As a free agent at the conclusion of his contract with the Flames, Thiessen went un-signed over the summer before accepting a professional try-out contract to attend the Columbus Blue Jackets training camp on September 16, 2015. On September 23, he was reassigned by the Blue Jackets to attend AHL affiliate, the Lake Erie Monsters, training camp. He was later signed by the Monsters to a two-way AHL/ECHL contract and was assigned to affiliate, the Cincinnati Cyclones.

He announced his retirement on June 3, 2021, after finishing his sixth season within the Cleveland Monsters organization.

Career statistics

Awards and honours

References

External links

1986 births
Living people
Adirondack Flames players
Canadian expatriate ice hockey players in Finland
Canadian expatriate ice hockey players in the United States
Canadian ice hockey goaltenders
Cincinnati Cyclones (ECHL) players
Cleveland Monsters players
HIFK (ice hockey) players
Ice hockey people from British Columbia
Lake Erie Monsters players
Norfolk Admirals players
Northeastern Huskies men's ice hockey players
People from Langley, British Columbia (district municipality)
Pittsburgh Penguins players
Prince George Spruce Kings players
Undrafted National Hockey League players
Wheeling Nailers players
Wilkes-Barre/Scranton Penguins players
AHCA Division I men's ice hockey All-Americans